For downtuning see:

Slack-key guitar, and
Guitar tunings, specifically Guitar tunings#Lower tunings, Guitar tunings#Dropped tunings, and Guitar tunings#Double-dropped tunings